Kneser's theorem may refer to:

 Kneser's theorem (combinatorics)
 Kneser's theorem (differential equations)

See also
 Tait-Kneser theorem